Becoming Led Zeppelin is an upcoming documentary film directed by Bernard MacMahon which traces the formation and early years of Led Zeppelin. The film is an independent production made with the full co-operation of the band and is the first time Led Zeppelin have agreed to participate in a biographical documentary. A work-in-progress was screened at the Venice Film Festival to a 10-minute standing ovation.

Synopsis 
Becoming Led Zeppelin traces the journeys of Jimmy Page, John Paul Jones, John Bonham and Robert Plant through the music scene of the 1960s, their meeting in the summer of 1968 and meteoric ascendancy throughout 1969, culminating in 1970 when they become the No. 1 band in the world.
The story is told exclusively by the band members with the late John Bonham represented by previously unheard audio interviews. The film features full performances, never-before-seen footage of the band's early U.S. and British concerts  and unseen material from the band’s personal archives.

Background 

Becoming Led Zeppelin is preceded by two concert films, the 1976 film The Song Remains the Same and the Celebration Day footage of the 2007 reunion concert at London's O2 Arena. Becoming Led Zeppelin was researched and written by Bernard MacMahon with screenwriter and producer Allison McGourty. According to Jimmy Page, he turned down a lot of “pretty miserable” pitches over the years to make a documentary about Led Zeppelin. However he received a deeply-researched proposal focusing almost exclusively on the music and chronicling the band's birth in 1968 and its early rise. The film was developed on a storyboard and presented to the band members in a leather-bound book. Page commented, “When we first met, we were probably a little nervous of each other. But the conduit was the storyboard”, adding “And I thought they’ve really got it, they really understand what it was about.” John Paul Jones gave his blessing saying “the time was right for us to tell our own story for the first time in our own words” and that the time was right for the film to be made. Robert Plant praised Bernard MacMahon’s work on American Epic, the Emmy-nominated 2017 documentary that chronicled the early American roots music recordings of the 1920s and cited it as a reason for agreeing to participate in the film, “Seeing Will Shade, and so many other important early American musicians, brought to life on the big screen in American Epic inspired me to contribute to a very interesting and exciting story.”

The film was announced in 2019, coinciding with the 50th anniversary of the band forming.

Reception 

Variety noted that the work-in-progress screening at the Venice Film Festival “premiered to bursts of rapturous applause across its 137-minute runtime.”  Rolling Stone described the rough cut of the film as "revelatory", and the Hollywood Reporter described it as “an eye-opening delight”, adding that sections of the rough cut “could be cut without damaging the film.”  Steve Pond of The Wrap described the rough cut as “potent as hell and as excessive as Physical Graffiti, the 1975 album whose excess was pretty much inseparable from its power.”

References 

Documentaries about music
Led Zeppelin
2020s documentary films
Films directed by Bernard MacMahon (filmmaker)